The Zweckverband Verkehrsverbund Oberlausitz-Niederschlesien (Upper Lusatia–Lower Silesia Transport Association or ZVON) is a transport association run by public transport providers in the German state of Saxony. The ZVON area comprises the district of Görlitz and the eastern part of the district of Bautzen.

Members 
The following companies are members of ZVON:

 Kraftverkehrsgesellschaft Dreiländereck mbH (KVG)
 Lassak-Reisen Bautzener Busreisen
 Omnibusbetrieb Beck 
 Omnibusbetrieb S. Wilhelm
 Ostdeutsche Eisenbahn GmbH (ODEG)
 Regionalbus Oberlausitz GmbH (RBO)
 Sächsisch-Oberlausitzer Eisenbahngesellschaft mbH (SOEG) 
 Schmidt-Reisen Busunternehmen 
 Verkehrsgesellschaft Görlitz GmbH (VGG)
 Die Länderbahn GmbH DLB – branded as Trilex

Railway service 
ZVON provides the following regional rail services in its area:

References

External links 

 

Transport in Saxony
Transport associations in Germany